The 2003 FIBA Under-19 World Championship (Greek: 2003 Παγκόσμιο Πρωτάθλημα FIBA Under-19) was the 7th edition of the FIBA U19 World Championship organized by FIBA. It was held in the Greek city of Thessaloniki from 10 to 20 July 2003.  won the tournament by beating , 126–92, in the final, for their maiden title. Andrew Bogut was named the tournament MVP.

Venue
The tournament was supposed to be held in Penang and Kuala Lumpur, Malaysia, however due to 2002–2004 SARS outbreak, on 25 May 2003, FIBA Central Board decided to move the competition to another venue. Greece, which previously hosted the 1995 edition, stepped forward to host the tournament.

Qualified teams

1Asia has 3 slots allotted and Malaysia qualified to the world championships as the initial hosts of the competition before it was relocated to Greece. Malaysia's qualification has been retained as no changes on the participation teams took place.

2Europe has 4 slots allotted and Greece qualified to the world championships as third placers. As Greece became the tournament hosts, fifth placer Turkey qualified to fill up the remaining European slot as a result.

Preliminary round

Group A

Group B

Group C

Group D

Quarterfinal round

Group E

Group F

Group G

Group H

Classification 13th–16th
</onlyinclude>

Semifinals

15th place

13th place

Classification 9th–12th
</onlyinclude>

Semifinals

11th place

9th place

Classification 5th–8th
</onlyinclude>

Semifinals

7th place

5th place

Final round
</onlyinclude>

Semifinals

3rd place

Final

Final standings

Statistical leaders

Points

Rebounds

Assists

Blocks

Steals

Player Game Highs

Awards

References

External links
 FIBA Basketball Archive

2003
2003 in basketball
2003–04 in Greek basketball
International youth basketball competitions hosted by Greece
Sports competitions in Thessaloniki